Estonia competed at the 2001 World Championships in Athletics.

Medalists

World Championships in Athletics
2001
Nations at the 2001 World Championships in Athletics